Thomas Granum (born December 31, 1989 in Drammen) is a Norwegian footballer currently playing for NSC Minnesota Stars in the USSF Division 2 Professional League.

Career

Norway
Granum was a trainee at Norwegian Tippeligaen team Strømsgodset, graduating to the senior side in 2008 aged 19. He played several games for the team in his debut professional season, but took a year off from football in 2009 to concentrate on his studies, returning to Strømsgodset before the 2010 Norwegian season.

United States
Granum left Strømsgodset in April 2010 and moved to North America when he signed for the NSC Minnesota Stars of the USSF Division 2 Professional League. He made his debut for the Stars on June 15, 2010, in a Lamar Hunt U.S. Open Cup game against KC Athletics.

References

1989 births
Living people
Norwegian footballers
Strømsgodset Toppfotball players
Minnesota United FC (2010–2016) players
USSF Division 2 Professional League players
Association football defenders
Sportspeople from Drammen